Åsa-Nisse in Military Uniform (Swedish: Åsa-Nisse i kronans kläder) is a 1958 Swedish comedy film directed by Ragnar Frisk and starring John Elfström, Artur Rolén and Brita Öberg. It was shot at the Täby Studios in Stockholm. It is the ninth film in the long-running Åsa-Nisse series about a raffish character living in rural Småland.

Cast
 John Elfström as Åsa-Nisse
 Artur Rolén as 	Klabbarparn
 Brita Öberg as 	Eulalia
 Mona Geijer-Falkner as Kristin
 Ann-Marie Adamsson as 	Ulla
 Lennart Lindberg as 	Olle
 Gustaf Lövås as 	Sjökvist
 Wiktor Andersson as	Knohultaren
 Bertil Boo as 	Bertil Boo
 Little Gerhard as 	Little Gerhard
 Gus Dahlström as 	107:an
 Stellan Agerlo as Burgler
 Sven Holmberg as Colonel
 Georg Årlin as 	Doctor
 Carl-Axel Elfving as 	Cpl. Busk 
 Georg Skarstedt as 	Travelling Salesman
 Astrid Bodin as 	Chefslottan
 Lennart Tollén as 	Lieutenant
 Aurora Åström as 	President of Women's League
 Stig Johanson as Pelle

References

Bibliography 
 Krawc, Alfred. International Directory of Cinematographers, Set- and Costume Designers in Film: Denmark, Finland, Norway, Sweden (from the beginnings to 1984). Saur, 1986.

External links 
 

1958 films
Swedish comedy films
1958 comedy films
1950s Swedish-language films
Films directed by Ragnar Frisk
Swedish sequel films
1950s Swedish films